The Moteng pass is a steep tarred pass in the Maloti mountains of Lesotho, reaching a height of . It is one of two passes that links the town of Butha-Buthe with the diamond mining town of Mokhotlong, the other pass being the Mahlasela pass. Heavy snowfall frequently closes the pass in winter. The pass is 7.9 km long, with the last stage being extremely dangerous in winter due to patches of ice.

References

Gallery 

Mountain passes of Lesotho